Harry Rowe (born 1987), known as Macer Gifford, is a British former currency trader and volunteer fighter and medic who, between mid-2015 and 2017, travelled to Syria to fight with the Kurdish YPG militia against the Islamic State group, and as of 2022, is a volunteer medic and recruiter for the Ukrainian Foreign Legion in Ukraine. He took his identity from National Hunt jockey Macer Gifford, the brother of four-time champion jockey Josh Gifford. He spent five months fighting with the YPG in 2015 before returning to the UK in 2015. In 2016 he completed a second tour with the YPG in Syria. In Ukraine, Gifford is reportedly "running a battlefield first aid training programme that he first pioneered with the Kurds [in Syria]."

Early life and career
Gifford is from Cambridge. He has previously been a Conservative Party councillor, and previously had no military training.

In 2016, Gifford took part in fighting around Manbij with the Syrian Democratic Forces (SDF), who were clearing the city of Manbij of ISIS forces.

After returning from Syria in 2015, he was initially barred from speaking at the University of London Union because the Union's events officer feared that his talk might encourage others to travel to fight in Syria. The decision was reversed after a petition calling on the Union to let Gifford speak was signed by 1,400 people and the Metropolitan Police advised the Union that it was 'legally acceptable' for the event to take place.

Gifford is attempting to set up a medical aid charity. He is currently fighting with the Syriac Military Council.

References

People of the Syrian civil war
People's Protection Units
1987 births
Living people